The Swiss Medical Weekly is a peer-reviewed open access medical journal published by the SMW supporting association. It was established in 1871 as the Correspondenz-Blatt für Schweizer Aerzte, then renamed to Schweizerische Medizinische Wochenschrift, before obtaining its current title in 2001. SMW was one of the first journals to adhere to the principles of Diamond open access (also known as Platinum Open Access). The editors-in-chief are Adriano Aguzzi and Gérard Waeber.

Abstracting and indexing 
The journal is abstracted and indexed in:
 MEDLINE/PubMed
 Science Citation Index Expanded
 Excerpta Medica
According to the Journal Citation Reports, the journal has a 2021 impact factor of 4.203.

Important papers 
In 1957 Roland Kuhn published an observational study on the effectiveness of Imipramine in treating Depression (mood).  Other examples are the fundoplication described by Rudolf Nissen in 1956 and the first description of a haemolytic-uraemic syndrome by Conrad Gasser in 1955.

See also 
 Revue Médicale Suisse

Notes and references

External links 
 

General medical journals
English-language journals
Publications established in 1971
Weekly journals
Open access journals